Mikel Smith Gibbs (born 10 September 1963) is a retired American-Spanish professional basketball player.

College career
Born in New York City, Smith played college basketball for USC–Spartanburg, beginning in 1982.

Professional career
Smith played for twelve years in Spain, notably for Joventut Badalona and Real Madrid. He was the Spanish League's Finals MVP in 1992. With Joventut Badalona, he won the EuroLeague championship of the 1993–94 season, by winning the 1994 EuroLeague Final Four.

Spain national team
Smith naturalized during his professional basketball play in Spain, and he played internationally for the senior Spain national team at two EuroBasket tournaments, 1995 and 1997.

External links
Mike Smith in USCS Hall of Fame
ACB.com Profile 

Living people
1963 births
American expatriate basketball people in Spain
American men's basketball players
Basketball players from New York City
Joventut Badalona players
Liga ACB players
Naturalised citizens of Spain
Power forwards (basketball)
Real Betis Baloncesto players
Real Madrid Baloncesto players
Spanish men's basketball players
Spanish people of American descent
USC Upstate Spartans men's basketball players